Rémi Berthet (born 31 October 1947) is a French judoka. He competed in the men's heavyweight event at the 1976 Summer Olympics.

References

1947 births
Living people
French male judoka
Olympic judoka of France
Judoka at the 1976 Summer Olympics
Place of birth missing (living people)